Scotinotylus columbia is a species of sheet weaver found in Canada. It was described by Chamberlin in 1949.

References

Linyphiidae
Spiders of Canada
Spiders described in 1949